RACT as an abbreviation may refer to:
Royal Australian Corps of Transport, a branch of the Australian Army
Royal Automobile Club of Tasmania, a motoring group in Tasmania, Australia
Reasonably Available Control Technology, a pollution control standard